is a Japanese actress and singer represented by Staff-up.

Biography
Jinbo entered Horikoshi High School and in March 1983 she graduated from Aoyama Gakuin University Faculty of Letters, Second Section of English and American Literature.

While in third-year junior high school, she won the 15th Battle Tournament in Nippon TV's Star Tanjō!.

In March 1976, Jinbo signed with Philips Records (now Universal Music Japan) and debuted as singer with the single "Hajimete no Waltz".

She performs as an actress and a singer. Jinbo is also a presenter in music series.

Notable performances are in Yōba (1976) and the horror-comedy film House (1977).

She appeared in an advertisement for DHC. Jinbo later commented in her blog that she loved DHC.

Filmography

Films

Drama

Direct-to-video

Stage

Variety

Radio series

Discography

Singles

References

External links
 

Japanese women singers
1960 births
Living people
Horikoshi High School alumni
Aoyama Gakuin University alumni
Actresses from Tokyo